Live at Theresa's 1975 is a live album recorded by blues vocalist and harmonica player Junior Wells at Theresa's Lounge in Chicago, Illinois, for Delmark Records.

The set was broadcast on local radio station WXRT.

Critical reception
No Depression wrote that it "has to be one of the most effectively you-are-there live albums ever recorded." Record Collector wrote: "One of the highlights is [Wells's] between-song talks, a feature of his intimate live work which is captured here in full." The Seattle Post-Intelligencer called the album "notable for great guitar work from journeymen Phil Guy and others."

Track listing 
"Little by Little" (Amos Blakemore  Junior Wells) - 4:41
"Snatch It Back and Hold It" (Blakemore) - 6:36
Talk - 0:24
"Love Her with a Feeling" (Tampa Red) - 4:12
Talk - 1:51
"Juke" (Little Walter) - 3:36
Talk - 1:00
"Happy Birthday" (Hill) - 1:27
Talk - 1:41
"Scratch My Back" (James Moore) - 5:44
"Help the Poor" (Charles Singleton) - 3:55
Talk - 0:39
"Come on in This House" (Blakemore) - 3:23
Talk - 0:41
"What My Mama Told Me" (Blakemore) - 8:04
"Key to the Highway" (Big Bill Broonzy, Charlie Segar) - 4:07
Talk - 0:12
"Goin' Down Slow" (James Burke Oden) - 8:27
Talk - 0:33
"Messin' with the Kid" (Melvin London) - 2:27

Personnel 
Band
Vince Chappelledrums
Phil Guyguitar
Earnest Johnsonbass
Sammy Lawhornguitar
Byther Smithguitar, vocals
Junior Wellsharmonica, vocals

Production
Marc PoKempnerphotography
Ken Rasekengineer
Steve Tomashefskyliner notes, supervisor
Robert G. Koesterproducer

References

Live blues albums
Junior Wells albums
2006 live albums
Albums produced by Bob Koester
Delmark Records live albums